Anoplotrupes is a genus of earth-boring dung beetles belonging to the family Geotrupidae subfamily Geotrupinae.

Species
Species within this genus include:
Anoplotrupes balyi (Jekel, 1866) 
Anoplotrupes hornii (Blanchard, 1888) 
Anoplotrupes stercorosus (Hartmann in L.G. Scriba, 1791)

References 

Geotrupidae